The 101st Panzer Brigade was a Panzer Brigade that fought in World War II.

History
The first 101st Panzer Brigade was formed on 5 July 1941 in France with captured tanks. On 21 September 1941, it was used to form the staff of the 23rd Panzer Division. Colonel Botho Elster was briefly in command of the brigade in 1941 before being transferred to OB West.

The second 101st Panzer Brigade was ordered to be formed on 11 July 1944 but was not formed until 15 August 1944. Like most Panzer Brigades, it had a battalion of Panther tanks and a battalion of panzergrenadiers in Sd.Kfz. 251 half tracks. It was a part of the ad hoc Panzerverband Strachwitz under Hyacinth Graf Strachwitz von Groß-Zauche und Camminetz. The 101st, along with the SS Panzer Brigade Gross, participated in Operation Doppelkopf to restore connection between Army Group North and Army Group Center. It was then deployed to the frontline on Estonia. In October 1944, the brigade was reformed near Bobruisk, then it was merged with the remains of the destroyed 20th Panzer Division. The brigade staff formed the Staff/21st Panzer Regiment, the panzer battalion became the 2/21st Panzer Regiment, while the panzergrenadier Battalion became a Jagd-Kommando in the 20th Panzer Division.

Order of battle

1941
 203rd Panzer Regiment
 204th Panzer Regiment

1944
 2101st Panzer Battalion (3 Panther tank companies, 1 Jagdpanzer IV company)
 2101st Panzergrenadier Battalion (3 companies)
 2101st Brigade Support Units

Commanders
 Oberst Botho Elster - 1941
 Oberst Meinrad von Lauchert - July - August 1944
 Oberst Richard Schmidthagen - August 1944
 Oberstleutnant Guido von Wartenburg - August - September 1944
 Major Eberhard Zahn - September - October 1944

Notes

Citations

References
Books

 
 
 

Websites

 

Armoured brigades of the German Army in World War II
Military units and formations established in 1944
Military units and formations disestablished in 1944
Military units and formations established in 1941
Military units and formations disestablished in 1941